Vaughan Snyman (born 30 January 1974) is a South African former professional tennis player.

Born in Port Elizabeth, Snyman played collegiate tennis in the United States, for the University of Alabama at Birmingham. He was a singles All-American in 1994 and twice earned All-American honours for doubles, forming a top ranked doubles partnership with countryman Paul Rosner.

Snyman competed on the professional tour after graduating from college in 1995. His highlights include featuring in the singles qualifying draws of the 1997 Australian Open and 1998 Wimbledon Championships. He won two doubles titles on the ATP Challenger Tour and his only ATP Tour main draw appearance also came in doubles, at the 1999 Majorca Open, where he and partner Marcus Hilpert won through to the quarter-finals.

Challenger titles

Doubles: (2)

References

External links
 
 

1974 births
Living people
South African male tennis players
UAB Blazers athletes
College men's tennis players in the United States
Sportspeople from Port Elizabeth